The United Democratic Party is a Ghanaian political party registered with the Electoral Commission of Ghana. Its founder is Yaw Kumey.

See also
 List of political parties in Ghana

References

External links
Political parties in Ghana, their emblems and colours

2004 establishments in Ghana
Political parties established in 2004
Political parties in Ghana